The year 1931 in television involved some significant events.
Below is a list of television-related events during 1931.



Events
May 1 – The first wedding is broadcast by television, on New York City's W2XCR.
July 21 – CBS's station W2XAB began broadcasting 28 hours a week in New York City. 

 August – At the Berlin Radio Show, Manfred von Ardenne gives the world's first public demonstration of a television system using a cathode-ray tube for both transmission and reception. Ardenne never develops a camera tube, using the CRT instead as a flying-spot scanner to scan slides and film.
October 9 – Canada's first television station, VE9EC, begins broadcasting in Montreal, Quebec. VE9EC was owned jointly by radio station CKAC and the newspaper company La Presse.
October 30 – NBC installs a television transmitter on top of the Empire State Building.
November 1 – Television images are transmitted from JOAK radio station in Tokyo, Japan by Professors Kenjiro Takayagani and Tomomasa Nakashima. The still images comprise 80 lines at 20 frames per second.
December 22 – NBC begins broadcasting experimental test transmissions from the Empire State Building transmitter.
December 23 – Don Lee Broadcasting begins broadcasting low-definition electromechanical television from the station W6XAO (later KTSL) in Los Angeles, broadcasting one hour of film footage, six days per week.

Debuts
 Exhibition Boxing Bouts premieres on the experimental W2XAB (1931–1932)
 Hints for Swimmers premieres on the experimental W2XAB (1931)
 Piano Lessons premieres on the experimental W2XAB (1931–1932).
 The Television Ghost premieres on the experimental W2XAB (1931–1933).
 Television Today premieres on the experimental W2XAB (1931).
 W2XAB debuts music segments with Connie Boswell, Doris Sharp, Elliot Jaffee, Grace Yeager, Harriet Lee, and Helen Haynes, among others.
 W2XCD debuts a semi-regular segment with singer Alice Remsen.

Television shows

Births
January 10 – Marlene Sanders, television news correspondent (died 2015)
January 11 – Peter Baldwin, actor (died 2017)
January 13
Charles Nelson Reilly, actor, game show panelist (died 2007)
Rip Taylor, comedian (died 2019)
January 15 – Thomas Hoving, American museum executive (died 2009)
January 17 – James Earl Jones, actor
January 19 – Robert MacNeil, news reporter
February 6 – Rip Torn, actor (died 2019)
February 8 - James Dean, actor, East of Eden, Rebel Without a Cause, Giant (died 1955)
February 13 – Geoff Edwards, game show host (died 2014)
February 24 – Dominic Chianese, actor
February 28 – Gavin MacLeod, actor, The Love Boat (died 2021)
March 11 – Rupert Murdoch, media mogul
March 20 – Hal Linden, actor, Barney Miller
March 22 – William Shatner, actor, Star Trek
March 26 – Leonard Nimoy, actor, Star Trek (died 2015)
March 27 – David Janssen, actor, The Fugitive (died 1980)
April 6 – Ivan Dixon, actor, Hogan's Heroes (died 2008)
April 12 – Betty Clooney, singer (died 1976)
April 26 – Bernie Brillstein, agent and producer (died 2008)
May 15 – Ken Venturi, golfer
May 16 – Jack Dodson, actor, The Andy Griffith Show (died 1994)
May 18 
Robert Morse, actor (died 2022)
George Shapiro, producer
Don Martin, cartoonist
May 23 – Barbara Barrie, actress, Barney Miller
June 8 – Dana Wynter, actress (died 2011)
June 14 – Marla Gibbs, actress, The Jeffersons, 227
June 20 – Olympia Dukakis, actress, Tales of the City (died 2021)
June 26 
Robert Colbert, actor, The Time Tunnel
Marvin Minoff, American film and television producer (died 2009)
July 1 – Leslie Caron, actress
July 6 – Della Reese, actress, singer, Touched by an Angel (died 2017)
July 8 – Roone Arledge, producer (died 2002)
July 10 – Nick Adams, actor (died 1968)
July 27 – Jerry Van Dyke, actor, Coach (died 2018)
July 28 – Darryl Hickman, actor
August 15 – Janice Rule, actress (died 2003)
August 23 – Barbara Eden, actress, I Dream of Jeannie
August 25 – Regis Philbin, talk show host (died 2020)
September 1 – Beano Cook, American television personality (died 2012)
September 4 – Mitzi Gaynor, singer, actress
September 9 – Barbara Lyon, singer, actress
September 10 – Philip Baker Hall, actor (died 2022)
September 11 – Bill Simpson, actor (died 1986)
September 12 
Bill McKinney, actor (died 2011)
Ian Holm, actor (died 2020)
September 13 – Barbara Bain, actress, Mission: Impossible
September 17 – Anne Bancroft, actress (died 2005)
September 19 – Ray Danton, actor (died 1992)
September 21 – Larry Hagman, actor, I Dream of Jeannie, Dallas (died 2012)
September 24 – Howard West, TV producer (died 2015)
September 30 – Angie Dickinson, actress, Police Woman
October 23 – Diana Dors, actress (died 1984)
October 31 – Dan Rather, news reporter
November 5 – Reese Schonfeld, news reporter (died 2020)
November 8 – Morley Safer, news reporter (died 2016)
November 12 – Dick Clair, writer (died 1988)
November 30 – Jack Ging, actor (died 2022)
December 3 – Jaye P. Morgan, game show panelist
December 11 – Rita Moreno, actress
December 23 – Ronnie Schell, comedian
December 28 – Martin Milner, actor, Adam-12 (died 2015)

References